Gub is the debut studio album by American rock band Pigface. It is notable for featuring contributions from Trent Reznor of Nine Inch Nails, with Reznor later re-recording the song "Suck" for the Nine Inch Nails EP, Broken, released in 1992.

Track listing 

Compact disc versions of Gub include the four remix tracks that originally appeared on the Spoon Breakfast EP.

Personnel 
 Martin Atkins - drums (1, 2, 4, 5, 7–12), sounds (3, 6)
 William Rieflin - drums (2-5, 7–12), guitar (7, 8, 12), bass (4, 9), synthesizer (10), sounds (1) 
 Paul Barker - bass (5, 12) vocals (9)
 Chris Connelly - vocals (4, 7, 8, 11, 12), tape loops (12), sounds (11)
 En Esch - vocals (10)
 Nivek Ogre - vocals (1)
 Trent Reznor - vocals (5), tape loops (2)
 Matt Schultz - sounds (11)
 William Tucker - guitar (7, 8)
 David Yow - vocals (2)
Additional assistance provided by
 Steve Albini - production (1-12), bass (1), guitar (4), sounds (9)
 Kurt Moore - sounds (5)

References

1991 debut albums
Pigface albums
Albums produced by Steve Albini